Belltown is an unincorporated community in Greene County, Illinois, United States. The community is located along Rt. 67 between White Hall and Carrollton.

References

External links
NACO-Green County

Unincorporated communities in Greene County, Illinois
Unincorporated communities in Illinois